Eknomoliparis chirichignoae is a species of snailfish native to the southeastern Pacific Ocean off the coast of Chile where it occurs at depths of from .  This species is the only known member of its genus.

References

Liparidae
Monotypic fish genera
Fish of Chile
Fish described in 1991